An Van Rie (born 9 June 1974) is a racing cyclist who was born in Menen, Belgium.

Palmarès

2005
2nd Belgian National Time Trial Championships

2006 (Lotto–Belisol Ladiesteam)
1st  Belgian National Time Trial Championships
10th La Flèche Wallonne Féminine

2007
1st  Belgian National Time Trial Championships

2008 (Vrienden van het Platteland)
3rd Stage 1, Tour de Pologne Feminin, Poddebice
1st  Belgian National Time Trial Championships

References

External links
An Van Rie Blog 

1974 births
Living people
Belgian female cyclists
People from Menen
Cyclists from West Flanders